Joe Litchfield (born 8 July 1998) is a British swimmer. He has won gold medals as part of a team at the European Championship, and a team bronze at the World Championship. His older brother Max Litchfield is also a swimmer.

Career

He competed in the men's 100 metre backstroke event at the 2020 European Aquatics Championships, in Budapest, Hungary. He won two gold medals as part of the team, swimming in the heats but not in finals, in 4×200 m mixed freestyle and 4×100 m mixed medley. He was also part of the team that won a silver in  Men's 4 × 100 metre freestyle relay.

At the 2022 World Aquatics Championships held in Budapest, Litchfield won a bronze as in the Men's 4 × 200 metre freestyle relay.

References

External links
 

1998 births
Living people
British male swimmers
British male backstroke swimmers
Place of birth missing (living people)
European Aquatics Championships medalists in swimming
Swimmers at the 2018 Commonwealth Games
Swimmers at the 2022 Commonwealth Games
Commonwealth Games medallists in swimming
Commonwealth Games silver medallists for England
Swimmers at the 2015 European Games
European Games medalists in swimming
European Games silver medalists for Great Britain
Swimmers at the 2020 Summer Olympics
Olympic swimmers of Great Britain
Universiade medalists in swimming
Universiade silver medalists for Great Britain
Universiade bronze medalists for Great Britain
World Aquatics Championships medalists in swimming
20th-century British people
21st-century British people
Medallists at the 2022 Commonwealth Games